The 1930 United States Senate election in Michigan was held on November 4, 1930. Incumbent Republican U.S. Senator James J. Couzens was re-elected to a second term in office over Democratic former U.S. Representative Thomas A. E. Weadock. 

Despite the national wave favoring Democrats, Couzens won by a landslide even larger than his 1924 landslide.

General election

Candidates
James J. Couzens, incumbent U.S. Senator since 1922 (Republican)
Milton E. Depew (Socialist)
George Powers (Workers)
Charles Rennells (Prohibition)
Thomas A. E. Weadock, former U.S. Representative from Bay City (Democratic)

Results

See also 
 1930 United States Senate elections

References 

1930
Michigan
United States Senate